Saltoro valley is Pakistan's highest valley. It is part of Baltistan, and is held by Pakistan. Along with Saltoro Kangri peak and the Saltoro River, it is near the Saltoro Mountain Range. It lies near world's highest battleground Siachen, a territory disputed by India and Pakistan. The Actual Ground Position Line (AGPL) between India held and Pakistan held area runs through this range where higher peaks and passes of disputed Siachen area are held by India and Pakistan occupies the lower peaks and valleys. In 1984, India captured most of the disputed Siachen area in the Operation Meghdoot. In April 1986, Pakistan launched an assault in the area, gaining control of a high point in the area located south of Bilafond La, and established a military post on the peak which was named "Quaid Post" in honour of their leader Quaid-e-Azam Muhammad Ali Jinnah. Between 23–26 June 1987, India launched a counter Operation Rajiv and snatched the Quaid Post from Pakistan, renaming it Bana Top in the honor of Bana Singh who was awarded India's highest gallantry award Param Vir Chakra.

See also 

Near the AGPL (Actual Ground Position Line)
 NJ9842 (peak) LoC ends and AGPL begins here 
 Gharkun (peak)
 Gyong Kangri (peak)
 Gyong La (pass)
 Goma (Siachen)
 Gyari (valley) 
 Chumik Kangri (peak)a
 K12 (mountain) (peak)
 Bana Top (peak)
 Bilafond La
 Saltoro Valley
 Ghent Kangri
 Sia La
 Sia Kangri
 Indira Col

 Borders
 Actual Ground Position Line (AGPL)
 India–Pakistan International Border {IB)
 Line of Control {LoC)
 Line of Actual Control (LAC)
 Sir Creek (SC)
 Borders of China
 Borders of India
 Borders of Pakistan

 Conflicts
 Kashmir conflict
 Siachen conflict
 Sino-Indian conflict
 List of disputed territories of China
 List of disputed territories of India
 List of disputed territories of Pakistan
 Northern Areas
 Trans-Karakoram Tract

 Operations
 Operation Meghdoot, by India
 Operation Rajiv, by India
 Operation Safed Sagar, by India

 Other related topics
 Awards and decorations of the Indian Armed Forces
 Bana Singh, after whom Quaid Post was renamed to Bana Top 
 Dafdar, westernmost town in Trans-Karakoram Tract
 India-China Border Roads
 Sino-Pakistan Agreement for transfer of Trans-Karakoram Tract to China

References

Valleys of Gilgit-Baltistan